Blowback is a podcast about American history and foreign policy hosted by Noah Kulwin and Brendan James.

Format 

The first season of the show was a ten part series dedicated to the Iraq War. Throughout the show audio clips from MSNBC and CNN and readings of news reports are provided as well as satirical skits performed by H. Jon Benjamin. The second season of the show focuses on U.S. intervention before and after the Cuban revolution, and includes more interviews with those who experienced the events discussed first hand. The third season of the show released in July 2022 and covers the events surrounding the Korean War.

Episodes

Season 1 (2020)

Season 2 (2021)

Season 3 (2022)

Season 4 (2023) 

James announced a fourth season on his Twitter account in December 2022, to be released in Summer 2023. The fourth season will be about Operation Cyclone and its consequences, including the creation of al-Qaeda and the September 11, 2001 attacks.

Reception 
According to Vince Mancini of UPROXX and Derek Robertson of Politico, Blowback was "painstakingly researched" and didactic in its approach, "bombarding the listener with the host's sturm-und-drang argument about the Iraq War as a portal to hell that directly caused our modern-day political ills". In a comparison of Blowback and Slow Burn, Slate's podcast about the Iraq War, Derek Robertson of Politico described Blowback as "an unapologetically left-wing re-examination of the war’s many causes and ongoing effects". Jake Greenberg of Podcast Review wrote that "Blowback is an excellent piece of history, one that documents the misadventures, deceits, and war crimes" of the Iraq War. Podcast Review called the topic of the second season "a tremendous fit for James and Kulwin's style".

See also 
The Fire This Time (audio documentary)

References

External links 

2020 podcast debuts
Audio podcasts
History podcasts
Socialist podcasts
American podcasts
Works about the Iraq War
Works about the Cuban Revolution
Works about the Korean War